Miroslav Gegić (Serbian Cyrillic: Мирослав Гегић; born 27 August 1984) is a Serbian football defender who plays for Smederevo in the Serbian First League.

Career
Gegić joined compatriot Dragan Dragutinović at Kazakhstan Premier League side FC Okzhetpes in June 2010. After spells playing abroad in Kazakhstan and Switzerland, Gegić returned to Serbia where he played for FK Hajduk Kula and FK BSK Borča before signing with Smederevo in 2013.

References

External links
 
 Srbijafudbal profile
 

1984 births
Living people
Sportspeople from Smederevo
Serbian footballers
Association football defenders
FK Smederevo players
FK Mladi Radnik players
FK Hajduk Kula players
FK BSK Borča players
FK Timok players
Serbian SuperLiga players
FC Okzhetpes players
Serbian expatriate footballers
Expatriate footballers in Switzerland
Expatriate footballers in Kazakhstan